Spotland is a district of Rochdale in Greater Manchester, England. The Rochdale ward name is Spotland and Falinge. The population of this ward at the 2011 census was 10,805. It lies on the River Spodden, and is the home of Spotland Stadium.

Historically a part of Lancashire, Spotland was formerly its own township within the ancient parish of Rochdale.

The name Spotland means "area around the Spodden", Spodden referring to the River Spodden, which itself means "spouting stream".

Spotland Primary School lies within the locality on Edmund Street.

References

Areas of Rochdale

pl:Spotland Stadium